Diego Ayala may refer to:

 Diego Ayala (footballer) (born 1990), Paraguayan footballer
 Diego Ayala (tennis) (born 1979), American tennis player